Brian Francis Gregory (born December 15, 1966) is an American college basketball coach who was most recently the head men's basketball coach at South Florida. He was previously serving as a consultant to Tom Izzo at Michigan State after being let go as head coach with Georgia Tech. Prior to coaching at Georgia Tech, he was the head coach at Dayton and an assistant coach under Izzo at Michigan State.

Early life and education
From 1985 to 1986, Gregory attended the U.S. Naval Academy where he played on the Navy team that featured David Robinson and advanced to the Elite Eight of the NCAA tournament. He then went to Oakland University where he was a three-time all conference selection and in 1990 was named an Academic All-American. In 1990, Gregory graduated from Oakland University with a Bachelor of Arts in secondary education. He went on to earn a Master of Arts in athletic administration at Michigan State, graduating in 1992.

Coach

Michigan State
Gregory was an assistant at Michigan State for five years, from 1999 to 2003, under head coach Tom Izzo. During that time, the Spartans reached the Final Four three times and won the 2000 national title.

Dayton
On April 9, 2003, Gregory was named the head basketball coach of the Dayton Flyers. As Flyers head coach, he led the team to the 2004 and the 2009 NCAA tournament as well as the 2008 National Invitation Tournament. On January 14, 2008, Gregory led the Dayton Flyers to a top-14 ranking in the AP poll. This was the highest ranking for Dayton in 40 years.

He capped off the 2009–10 season by leading the Flyers to the 2010 NIT championship over North Carolina. Gregory had a 172–94 record with the Flyers over eight seasons and NCAA Tournament appearances.

Georgia Tech
On March 28, 2011, it was announced that Gregory would become the 13th head coach at Georgia Tech replacing Paul Hewitt. Gregory struggled at Georgia Tech, only finishing above .500 two times.

He failed to make a postseason appearance in his first four years at Georgia Tech. On March 16, 2015, Georgia Tech announced that Gregory would continue as head basketball coach for another year, despite the fact he never had a conference finish higher than ninth. In the 2015–16 season, Georgia Tech improved, finishing the season 21–15 and did receive a bid to the National Invitation Tournament, their first postseason trip under Gregory. The Yellow Jackets won two games before losing in the quarterfinals.

After a 5th consecutive losing record in the ACC, Georgia Tech Athletic Director Mike Bobinski announced on March 25, 2016, that Gregory would not return for the 2016–17 season. His record was 76–86 overall and 27–61 in ACC play.

Gregory would serve as a consultant to his old head coach Tom Izzo at Michigan State during the 2016–17 season.

South Florida 
On March 14, 2017, Gregory was hired as head coach at South Florida to replace Orlando Antigua.

USF went 10–22 in Gregory's first season, which was the first time the program posted ten wins since the 2014–15 season – the first of the Antigua era. It posted a 7–11 record at the Yuengling Center (formerly the USF Sun Dome), but struggled away from home, collecting just three wins away from Tampa. The Bulls finished 3–15 in AAC play, last in the conference and was a first-round exit in the 2018 conference tournament.

Gregory welcomed nine new players to the program for the 2018–19 season. USF also was benefitted by Gardner–Webb transfer Laquincy Rideau, who came off a redshirt season in 2017–18 and Alexis Yetna's addition to the hardwood. It started the season 10–2 through non-conference play before going 8–10 in AAC play. Under Gregory's eye, Rideau earned an AAC Defensive Player of the Year honor, while Yetna was named the league's Freshman of the Year for their efforts during the regular season.

Although it was bounced in the first round of the conference tournament yet again, this time by UConn, USF received a bid to play in the College Basketball Invitational, the third tier postseason college basketball tournament.

The Bulls came back from a 25-point deficit to defeat Stony Brook in the first round before defeating Utah Valley and Loyola Marymount to reach the CBI finals.

In a three-game series against DePaul, the Bulls took two-of-three (63–61, 96–100 OT, 77–65) to win the tournament. Sophomore guard David Collins was named as the tournament's MVP. In the process, USF finished 24–14 and had the largest improvement among NCAA Division I teams.

Three Bulls – Rideau, Collins and Yetna – were named preseason all-conference selections before the 2019–20 season. Yetna, who had battled a leg injury and rehabbed over the previous summer, suffered a devastating knee injury in practice prior to the team's season opening game against Arkansas-Pine Bluff and was ruled out for the season. Former LSU transfer Mayan Kiir left the team as well, turning the Bulls into one of the largest teams in the AAC to one of the smallest teams in the conference. As a result, the Bulls struggled offensively and failed to reach 70 points in 24 in 31 of their games. However, USF was extremely strong on the defensive side of the court, ranking 20th in the NCAA in scoring defense (62.7 PPG), while holding 27 of its 31 opponents under their season scoring average at the time of play.

USF failed to put together a second straight winning season under Gregory, going 14–17 and 7–11 in AAC play. The Bulls were slated to play War on I-4 rival UCF in the first round of the conference tournament before the conference announced the cancelation of the game due to the COVID-19 pandemic, just 65 minutes before tipoff between the Bulls and Knights.

Over the extended break caused by the coronavirus, the Bulls added length and saw the return of Yetna to the starting rotation. Former Mississippi State PF Prince Oduro and Texas Tech C Russel Tchewa joined the squad and the Bulls brought in consensus four-star combo guard Caleb Murphy to bolster a team that just lost two seniors and one outgoing transfer. USF was picked to finish 5th in the AAC in the 2020–21 season.

Gregory won his 300th career game as a head coach on December 12, 2020, against Wofford.

It was announced on January 4, 2022, that Gregory's contract would be extended until the 2025–26 season, as a part of 14 overall head coach extensions executed by USF Vice President of Athletics Michael Kelly. 

On March 10, 2023 Gregory was relieved of his duties as South Florida Head Coach.

Head coaching record

References

External links
 South Florida profile
 Georgia Tech profile
 Dayton profile
 Michigan State profile

1966 births
Living people
American men's basketball coaches
Basketball coaches from Illinois
Basketball players from Illinois
College men's basketball head coaches in the United States
Dayton Flyers men's basketball coaches
Georgia Tech Yellow Jackets men's basketball coaches
Michigan State Spartans men's basketball coaches
Navy Midshipmen men's basketball players
Northwestern Wildcats men's basketball coaches
Oakland Golden Grizzlies men's basketball players
People from Mount Prospect, Illinois
South Florida Bulls men's basketball coaches
Toledo Rockets men's basketball coaches
American men's basketball players
Point guards
Military personnel from Illinois